Fernando de la Concha was the Governor of New Mexico between 1789 and 1794.

Biography
Fernando de la Concha joined the Spanish Army in his youth, eventually becoming a Colonel. 
De la Concha was appointed Governor of Santa Fe de Nuevo México in 1789. In 1792 (and following orders of the viceroy Revillagigedo) Concha sent explorers Pedro Vial, Vicente Villanueva, and Vicente Espinosa to Saint Louis to establish a trade route. This route would be later known as the Santa Fe Trail. 

Fernando de la Concha was replaced by  Fernando Chacón in the New Mexico government in 1794.

References

External links 
UAIR: Revilla Gigedo (conde de) (virrey). note to governor of New Mexico Fernando de la Concha acknowledging receipt of report that grain supplies for Apaches and mumbres are being distributed. 

Colonial governors of Santa Fe de Nuevo México